Rafiqul Islam Miah is a Bangladeshi barrister and politician. He served as the State Minister for Labour and Manpower and later as Minister of Housing and Public Works in the first Khaleda Zia cabinet during 1991–1996. He also served as Minister of Education in the government formed after the February 1996 Bangladeshi general election.

Career
In September 2007, Miah served as the lawyer of Begum Khaleda Zia when she was arrested on charges of corruption and misuse of power. In 2008 Rafiqul represented the Bihari community in Bangladesh as they were granted citizenship status by High Court of Bangladesh. He is currently a member of the National Standing Committee of the Bangladesh Nationalist Party.

Conviction
In 2001, Anti-Corruption Commission of Bangladesh sent Miah a notice to submit his wealth statement. Failure to comply with that notice, in January 2004, led a case filed against him. On 19 November 2018, he was sentenced to three years in prison and was arrested from his Eskaton home the same day . On 26 November, he secured a six-month bail from the High Court which also stayed the fines.

References

Living people
Bangladeshi barristers
Bangladesh Nationalist Party politicians
Housing and Public Works ministers of Bangladesh
Date of birth missing (living people)
Place of birth missing (living people)
Year of birth missing (living people)